Jan Antoni Uczkowski (born October 7, 1996) is an American actor. He has an older brother, Dariusz Michal, who is also an actor.

Filmography

References

External links
 
  

1996 births
American male child actors
Living people